Puerto Rico Highway 36 (PR-36) is an urban road in Santurce. This is a road that connects from Avenida Juan Ponce de León (PR-25) to Avenida Barbosa (PR-27). It provides access to Barrio Obrero, Las Palmas and Las Casas from Martín Peña and the southern part of Monteflores. This road is called Avenida Borinquen.

Major intersections

See also

 List of highways numbered 36

References

External links
 

036
Roads in San Juan, Puerto Rico